Copelatus thrasys is a species of diving beetle. It is part of the genus Copelatus of the subfamily Copelatinae in the family Dytiscidae.

References

thrasys
Beetles described in 1952